Rodolfo Caccavo (24 October 1927 – 17 February 1958) was an Argentine cyclist. He competed in the 4,000 metres team pursuit event at the 1952 Summer Olympics.

References

1927 births
1958 deaths
Argentine male cyclists
Olympic cyclists of Argentina
Cyclists at the 1952 Summer Olympics
Cyclists from Buenos Aires
Pan American Games medalists in cycling
Pan American Games gold medalists for Argentina
Pan American Games bronze medalists for Argentina
Cyclists at the 1951 Pan American Games
Medalists at the 1951 Pan American Games